Tigimma was during the Roman Empire a civitas of Africa Proconsularis. The town has been tentatively identified with ruins near Djemâa.

The town was also the seat of an ancient Christian bishopric
Which survives today as a titular see of the Roman Catholic Church.
 and the current bishop is Stanislaw Dowlaszewicz, who replaced Luciano Storero in 2000.

References

Catholic titular sees in Africa
Former Roman Catholic dioceses in Africa
Roman towns and cities in Tunisia
Ancient Berber cities